Tajjar Karam-e Panahabad (also Romanized as Tajjar Karam-e Panāhābād; also known as Karam-e Panāhābād) is a village in Shiyan Rural District, in the Central District of Eslamabad-e Gharb County, Kermanshah Province, Iran. At the 2006 census, its population was 382, in 86 families.

References 

Populated places in Eslamabad-e Gharb County